Zieria lasiocaulis, commonly known as Willi Willi zieria, is a rare species of flowering plant in the citrus family Rutaceae and is endemic to New South Wales. It is a tall shrub or small tree with three-part leaves and inconspicuous white flowers, found only at high altitudes in areas with a high rainfall.

Description
Younger branches are covered with fine hairs. The leaves are more or less glabrous but strongly scented when crushed. The flowers are usually arranged in large groups, the groups shorter than the leaves. Flowering occurs from late autumn to spring and the fruits which follow in summer are glabrous and dotted with oil glands.

Taxonomy and naming
Zieria lasiocaulis was first formally described in 2002 by Jim Armstrong and the description was published in Australian Systematic Botany from a specimen collected on Mount Banda Banda. According to Armstrong, the specific epithet (lasiocaulis) is derived from Greek lasio meaning "hairy" and  caulis, meaning "stem", referring to the long, simple hairs on the younger branches. The ancient Greek word for "hairy" is lasios (λάσιος) and the word for "stem" is kaulos (καυλός). Caulis is the Latin word for "stem".

Distribution and habitat
Willi Willi zieria grows on rocky cliffs and on rainforest margins in the Willi Willi National Park, Werrikimbe National Park and New England National Park.

Conservation
This zieria is classified as "endangered" under the New South Wales Threatened Species Conservation Act and the Commonwealth Government Environment Protection and Biodiversity Conservation Act 1999 (EPBC) Act.  The main threat to the species is inappropriate fire regimes.

References

lasiocaulis
Sapindales of Australia
Flora of New South Wales
Plants described in 2002